Century High School is an alternative high school for the Los Lunas Public Schools in Los Lunas, New Mexico.

Location

The school is located at 32 Sun Valley Road in Los Lunas, New Mexico.

References

Public high schools in New Mexico
Schools in Valencia County, New Mexico
Alternative schools in the United States